Thorame-Haute is a commune in the Alpes-de-Haute-Provence department in southeastern France.

Geography
The culminating point is on the mountain of Grand-Coyer. The point low corresponds to the bed of the Verdon valley. The commune is more downstream from the High-Verdon. The village of Thorame is surrounded by four mountain peaks: Chamatte, Cheinet, Serpeigier, and Cordeil.

Hydrography
 The village lies on right bank of the Verdon.
 Riou, small torrent which crosses the village,
 In the east the limits of the commune join the valley of the Vaïre.
 The lake of Sagnes, a reservoir.

Villages and localities
The commune is composed of several villages, among which are Colle-Saint-Michel and Peyresq, old communes having amalgamated in 1964, before being attached to Thorame in 1974. Peyresq is characterized by its exceptional site and its mountain architecture which was restored.

Another remarkable village is that of Ondres, which is not inhabited anymore in a permanent way and which refused modern comfort: running water, electricity, telephone; the access road is not paved. However a group of estivants required electrical installation recently; in their majority the inhabitants refused it. In summer the population of Ondres can exceed 100 inhabitants.

Villages: Thorame (chief town), Ondres, Colle-Saint-Michel, Peyresq. Other localities: Branchaï, Thorame-Haute-Gare, La Rivière, La Royère, Plan-de-Lys, Fontanil, Font-Gaillarde, l'Iscle, Plan-de-Verdon.

Some streets and districts of the village: The name of the streets take again the names which appear on the old land register of the middle of the 19th century, and which corresponded rather to names of districts such as: Saint-Pierre, Saint-Julien, Rastellone, Subret, Peyran. Riou constitutes a true suburb located at the North and the top of the historical center, it seems that it developed as from the seventeenth century to answer the rise of population, it took the name of the river which crosses the village. From its structure, it constitutes a village within the village with its ordered streets and its two fountains.

Roads
The chief town is located at the crossroads of the roads of valley of the Means the Verdon, D 955, of the valley of the Vaïre and the High Verdon D 908 and that which connects it to Saint-André-les-Alpes, passing by Thorame-Basse and the valley of the Issole, D 2. The train station is the only one in the High-Verdon, and the railway connects Digne to Nice. The tunnel, the longest of the line, connects the valley of the Verdon to that of the Vairy.

Population

The inhabitants are called Thoramiens.

Economy
Today still, the main activity remains agriculture (ovine breeding mainly, but so bovine and porcine). The cultures are especially directed towards fodder; cereals are also found. The significant number of farms, considering the remainder of the valley, is explained partly by the quality and the extent of the grounds around the village. There is an agricultural cooperative and a co-operative of distillation of lavender, which is of special interest to tourists, as the culture of the lavender having practically disappeared since the 1970s.

The tourist activity remains limited in spite of a certain development in the years 1970–1980, with the Scandinavian ski station of the Colle Saint-Michel. The cultural activities and university are particularly rich which are held each year at the village of Peyresq, conducted by various associations. The summer period offers many activities.

Trade
In spite of the disappearance of several trades in recent years, there are several hotels, restaurants, a bakery, a butchery-grocer, and a tobacconist's shop. Some craftsmen are also counted.
Thorame has a post office, a public school comprising a primary class and a nursery school. Thorame has the only station of the High-Verdon on the line Nice-Worthy of the Railroads of Provence (different from the National company of the railroads French, the SNCF). Finally, it is necessary to announce the presence of the office of ONF. The commune was also the chief town of the canton, formed by the two communes of the same name circa 1811, which was undoubtedly because of the importance of the population of the two villages (more than 1500 inhabitants).

History

Etymology
The name "Thorame" comes from Latin "Turris-Amena" literally "turn agréable", undoubtedly coming at the same time from the Roman administrative position of Thorame, and its pleasant site: the valley perpendicular to the Verdon River, directed east–west, its sunning and the quality of the ground. The term "turris" does not indicate only the tower with the direction today, but more generally, an urbanized place which can fulfill various functions. Later one finds the name Toramena or Thoramena. On several charts dating from the 17th century, it is mentioned as "Thoramenes". Thorame is thus a "name moderne" adapted in French. It is still necessary to note the female kind of the name Thorame, which can appear still surprising today.

Antiquity
One frequently associates the name "Eturamina" (for Thorame) with the Roman period for the territory then indistinct of both Thorame. The village occupied a particular order in the Gallo-Roman administrative hierarchy, having the statute of "Civitas" following the example Glandeves (Entrevaux), Senensis (Senez) or Dinia (Digne-les-Bains). Eturamina is one of the first Evéchés of High Provence at the 4th century, before being transferred to Senez. An engraved tegula (Roman tile), found during drainage works in the 19th century, is preserved at the Museum of the National antiquities of German St in Bush hammer. One finds the name of the bishop Sévérianus, who left his name in several councils which attests to his presence and religious role of Eturamina. It is extremely probable that the choice of the establishment in this valley corresponds to a will of Christianization of the people living back in the alpine valleys, which would explain also its transfer soon after at the beginning of the 5th century with Senez.

Middle Ages
With the Middle Ages, there are several documents concerning the establishments of monks, in particular of Saint-Victor, who mention Thoramina as of the 13th century. The 13th century is also marked by the installation of rich person seigneuriales families. It is supposed that the scission of the territory goes back to this period with a geographical qualifier: Supériori for Top and Infériori for Bottom, from where Thoramina Supériori which will become with the wire of the century Thorame-High. This period is also marked by the appearance of a legend related to an "appearance céleste", this one is at the origin of the vault of Notre Dame of the Fleur and her pilgrimage which remains today. The history and the built inheritance remain today badly included/understood because of information often too compartmental. Fifteen seigneuriales families continue until 1789, the last being the family of Pazery on 17 June 1711 the seigniory with Balthazar of Villeneuve. Some seigneuriale family are known: Seigniory of Glandevez at the 14th century, then of Villeneuve, Gassendi and Pazery.

Renaissance
In 1574, the village is set by the Huguenots, the destruction of “Fort St George” goes back to this time. The valley of the High Verdon is impacted by the Wars of religion and several villages are destroyed; one can suppose that the village of Thorame is shaved or largely destroyed in the second half of the 16th century. The absence of lintels dated before 1555 or more probably 1605, the weak architectural traces former to the 16th century seem to support this assumption. Nothing can nevertheless be marked without a work with the Files. In 1630, an epidemic of plague is highly fatal, in the 1720, the village has a new epidemic of plague and a setting in voluntary quarantine by the inhabitants the village. Chart of Cassini: bond towards the village.

Contemporary time
In the middle of the 19th century, the village reaches its peak of population with in particular, the activity of the cloth factories, and the count is 830 inhabitants in 1840. The 19th century thus corresponds to a period of demographic apogee, as much as economic prosperity. This prosperity comes mainly from an industrial activity which strongly develops in the valley: that of draperies. However the decline is rather fast with the opening of the valley outside and the arrival of the competition of draperies of North. The factories of Thorame close before the First World War. The many modifications made to the village testify to this " news ère" who modelled more than any previous century the current face of Thorame: work of municipal administration (fountains, laundrettes, communal furnace, new town hall...), richness of the places of worships (parish church, vaults, pilgrimage of the Fleur...), and work of the particular houses (crushing it majority of the dated lintels, the rich person decorations of modénature painted on the frontages are the most visible expression).

20th century
During the First World War, the common pay a heavy tribute which accelerates the loss of population already engaged since the years 1850. Years 1960-1970 are remembered by the modernization of the village: work and health measures, roadway systems, creation of an artificial lake (reservoir) in Sagnes for the watering of the arable lands, but also for tourism. The communes obtains new equipment: village halls, posts, etc.

On 1 March 1974 the commune of Saint-Michel-Peyresq was attached, itself resulting from the fusion of the communes of the Colle-Saint-Michel and Peyresq in November 1964.

The years 1980 and 1990 are remembered by a relative tourist decline, which seems stopped today. The number of farms falls rather quickly in the years since 1990, even if there remains still important by comparison with the common neighbors. In December 2004, the intercommunity association of the High Verdon, becomes the Communauté of communes of the High Ale Verdon-Valley, which recovers a big part of the commune.

Today
Today the commune is marked by a revival of the population and its renovation, the real estate knows a " boom" without precedent, the prices increase with the request, and the real pressure should result in the agricultural disappearance of land near the village, with the profits of new allotments.

Heraldic
The blazon Thorame-High is described in the following way: "Of gold with sinople mountain on castle of gueule"; translation: "a red tower on green mountain, the whole under bottom gold (or yellow)".

Archeology
During the 20th century, several interesting discoveries were made during public works, the principal ones which one can quote are located in the middle of the village itself and in particular along the wall of the parish church, with tombs and objects clearly identified of the Roman period: vase and inscriptions on tile, preserved at the museum of the National antiquities of Saint-Germain-in-Bush hammer.

Certain documents of DRAC mention engraved stone fragments discovered during work on houses of the village; one notices also certain inscriptions present on the stones of the frontages or the lintels of some houses. Others discovered were done around the vault of Serret, but the objects undoubtedly disappeared, and the studies undertaken into 1982 are very summary. There is, however, still the presence of base old and pavements, without it being possible to affirm with certainty the orientation of this old building. These objects testify to an occupation older, former to the Middle Ages.

Saint-owner and Festivities
Traditionally the employers' festival of Saint-Julien is held each year Sunday after August 15. With the 18th century, Thorame-High celebrated five festivals dedicated to saints: St Clearly on January 2, and St Blaise on February 3, St Georges, owner of the commune on April 23, and St Julien the holder of the parish church on August 28. Finally Sunday of the Trinity: Sunday of Pentecost, the votive festival of N.D. of the Fleur with her procession and religious ceremonies with the sanctuary. Today remain only St Julien, festival employers' of the village (procession, various festivities - ball, quizzes of balls...). Formerly the village also organized on the great place a cattle fair which was held annually until the 1950s (on April 23 and 1 Monday of October). Nowadays, the summer period offers important programming of cultural, sporting and festive events.

Administration

Sights
Thorame-Haute has a rich history, but still rarely known, which left some interesting monuments:

 Parish church of Saint George, whose chorus is rebuilt in 1598 and the nave at the 19th century, and which shelters several old fabrics in particular of the painter Rouvier. Website of the diocese of Worthy: *Ancians parish church of the St. Lawrence (Odres), and Saint Michel (the Colle-Saint-Michel, 1750)
 Notre Dame Vault of the Fleur at Thorame-High-Station (beginning of the 20th century), Website of the diocese of Worthy: *Chapelle Notre Dame of Serret
 Vaults of Roch Saint and Saint Joseph
 Several oratories (Notre-Dame, Saint-Anthony...) with the chief town and in the variations
 Extremely ruined Trancastel
 7 fountains and laundrettes with the chief town
 Old factories and mills of the 19th century
 Bridge "of Moulin" first half of the 17th century, classified historic building
 Church of Peyresq, 13th century, classified historic building
 typical Villages of altitude: Peyresq and Ondres

Natural sites
 High valley of the Verdon and many tributary torrents.
 Circuses of high mountains.
 wooded territories.
 Source of Fontgaillarde with cave.
 Throats of Saint-Pierre.
 artificial lake of Sagnes.
 Fauna and flora (animals of altitude: chamois...)
 picturesque site of the village of the Colle-St-Michel, on an edge separating the valleys from the Verdon and the Vairy one.
 Source of Vairy in Peyresc.
 Sites and panoramas of high mountain.

Associations
There are many associations among which:
 the Association for the safeguard of the cultural heritage of Thorame-High, it is amongst other things occupied to emphasize the built inheritance (vaults, sites...)
 the Free trade union of Serpégier, this organization unclassable is the heiress of a very old organization, it is appeared as an association of owners in joint possessions on pieces of drills. Through the incomes which it generates, it takes part in the public investments or private having a collective interest carried out on the commune.
 Village of Ondres
 friends of the Colle-saint-Michel
 holy Hubert thoramienne, company of hunting
 ASBL Nicolas-Claude Fabri de Peiresc which is defined as European Association for the culture and artistic and scientific humanism
 AEP of the High Verdon, association of popular education
 Pro Peyresq ASBL.

See also
 Peyresq
 Thorame-Basse
 Verdon (river)
 Communes of the Alpes-de-Haute-Provence department

References

Bibliography
 Raymond Collier : La vie en haute Provence de 1600 à 1850 (Société scientifique et littéraire des Alpes-de-Haute-Provence, Digne, 1973).
 Géraldine Bérard, Carte archéologique des Alpes-de-Haute-Provence, Académie des Inscriptions et Belles-Lettres, Paris, 1997
 Chroniques du Pays de Thorame-Haute un site une histoire des hommes, Félix Jaume, published by the Association du syndicat libre de Serpégier, Juin 2001, (Archives départementales (121 pages) with Annexes Documents et transcriptions (182 pages)
 Notre Dame de la Fleur sa légende sa statue ses pèlerinages, Félix Jaume, published by Comité de gestion de Notre Dame de la Fleur (95 pages), (Archives départementales).

Communes of Alpes-de-Haute-Provence
Alpes-de-Haute-Provence communes articles needing translation from French Wikipedia